Hervé Jean-Marie Roger Renard (born 30 September 1968) is a French professional football coach and former player who is the manager of the Saudi Arabia national team.

Renard has previously been the manager of Zambia national team, with whom he won the 2012 Africa Cup of Nations; he also won the competition in 2015 with the Ivory Coast, becoming the first coach to win two Africa Cup of Nations with different teams. In addition, he coached Morocco at the 2018 World Cup. In 2019, he was appointed as manager of Saudi Arabia.

Early life
Renard was born on 30 September 1968 in Aix-les-Bains, Auvergne-Rhône-Alpes.

Playing career
Born in Aix-les-Bains, Renard played as a defender for French sides AS Cannes, Stade de Vallauris and SC Draguignan in a playing career which lasted from 1983 to 1998. After retiring as a professional player he worked as a cleaner, working there in the morning and training with Draguignan in the evening, eventually starting his own cleaning company.

Coaching career

Early years
Renard began his coaching career with SC Draguignan in 1999, leaving in 2001. He was Assistant at Chinese side Shanghai Cosco with head coach Claude Le Roy from 2002 to 2003, and managed English side Cambridge United in 2004, having first joined the club with Le Roy to serve as a coach.

He became manager of Vietnamese club Song Da Nam Dinh in 2004, leaving them after several months. He became manager of AS Cherbourg in 2005, leaving them in 2007. He next became Assistant to Claude Le Roy for the Ghana national side.

In May 2008, he was appointed manager of the Zambia national team. At the 2010 Africa Cup of Nations, he led Zambia to the quarter final stage of the tournament for the first time in 14 years. Renard left his duties as Zambia manager in April 2010 with only two months remaining on his contract. Two days later he agreed to become manager of Angola. He resigned from his position as Angola manager in October 2010, and was replaced by Zeca Amaral.

USM Alger
On 21 January 2011, Renard reached an agreement with Algerian club USM Alger to become the head coach of the club.

Second spell with Zambia
On 22 October 2011, it was announced that Renard had returned for a second stint as coach of Zambia on a one-year contract. He led the team to their first victory in the African Cup Of Nations in 2012. The win was dedicated to the 18 players who perished in April 1993, after a plane carrying the squad crashed just miles from the site of the 2012 final in Gabon.

In May 2012, Chishimba Kambwili, the Zambian sports minister, announced he expected Renard to sign a new contract by the end of the month.

After Zambia were eliminated from the group stages of the 2013 African Cup of Nations, Renard said that it was his fault. He later criticised CAF for not allowing Zambia, as the 2012 winners of the AFCON, the chance to compete at the 2013 Confederations Cup.

Renard was released from his contract by the Football Association of Zambia in October 2013, in preparation for a role with French club FC Sochaux.

Sochaux
On 7 October 2013 it was announced that Renard was appointed as the new manager of French Ligue 1 side Sochaux. In April 2014 he was linked with the Morocco national team job.

The club was involved in a relegation fight in May 2014, and after being relegated, he left the club later that month. In July 2014 he was announced to be on the shortlist for the Ivory Coast job.

Ivory Coast
Renard was appointed as manager of the Ivory Coast national team in July 2014. He was manager at the 2015 Africa Cup of Nations, and praised the organization of the tournament. He won the competition, becoming the first coach to win two Africa Cup of Nations with different countries.

Lille
Renard became manager of French club Lille in May 2015. On 11 November 2015, he was sacked after getting only 13 points in 13 league games.

Morocco

In February 2016, Renard was linked with the vacant Morocco national team job. Later that month he was appointed as the new Morocco manager. In October 2016 he was linked with the vacant Algeria national team job.

In November 2017, he qualified Morocco to the 2018 FIFA World Cup in Russia, their first since 1998. Later that month, he signed a new contract, until 2022. In July 2019 the Moroccan team was eliminated from the 2019 Africa Cup of Nations, with Renard taking responsibility for the "shock exit". He resigned a few days later, on 15 July 2019.

Saudi Arabia
Later in July 2019 he became manager of Saudi Arabia, the first Frenchman to do so. On 10 September 2019, he managed his first official match against Yemen in the 2022 FIFA World Cup qualification. In March 2022, Renard led Saudi Arabia to qualification for the 2022 FIFA World Cup, and in the process became the foreign-born manager with the most wins (18) in the nation's history. In their opening game of the World Cup, he led Saudi Arabia to a 2–1 win over Argentina, one of the pre-tournament favourites, in what was considered one of the biggest shock results in World Cup history. However, Saudi Arabia lost the other two matches against Poland and Mexico, to be eliminated from the group stage.

In March 2023 Renard was linked with the job as coach of France women's national football team following the dismissal of Corinne Diacre.

Personal life
Renard is in a relationship with Viviane Dièye, the widow of coach Bruno Metsu.

His maternal grandparents were from Poland.

Honours

As a manager
Zambia
COSAFA Cup: 2013
Africa Cup of Nations: 2012

Ivory Coast
Africa Cup of Nations: 2015

Individual
 CAF Coach of the Year: 2012, 2015, 2018

References

1968 births
Living people
People from Aix-les-Bains
Footballers from Auvergne-Rhône-Alpes
French footballers
Association football defenders
AS Cannes players
SC Draguignan players
Ligue 1 players
French football managers
SC Draguignan managers
Cambridge United F.C. managers
AS Cherbourg Football managers
Zambia national football team managers
Angola national football team managers
USM Alger managers
FC Sochaux-Montbéliard managers
Ivory Coast national football team managers
Lille OSC managers
Morocco national football team managers
French expatriate football managers
French expatriate sportspeople in England
Expatriate football managers in England
French expatriate sportspeople in Vietnam
Expatriate football managers in Vietnam
French expatriate sportspeople in Zambia
Expatriate football managers in Zambia
French expatriate sportspeople in Angola
Expatriate football managers in Angola
French expatriate sportspeople in Algeria
Expatriate football managers in Algeria
French expatriate sportspeople in Ivory Coast
Expatriate football managers in Ivory Coast
French expatriate sportspeople in Morocco
Expatriate football managers in Morocco
2010 Africa Cup of Nations managers
2012 Africa Cup of Nations managers
2013 Africa Cup of Nations managers
2015 Africa Cup of Nations managers
2017 Africa Cup of Nations managers
2018 FIFA World Cup managers
Sportspeople from Savoie
Cambridge United F.C. non-playing staff
2019 Africa Cup of Nations managers
Saudi Arabia national football team managers
French expatriate sportspeople in Saudi Arabia
Expatriate football managers in Saudi Arabia
French people of Polish descent
2022 FIFA World Cup managers